Gobiopsis uranophilus is a species of goby, which is a type of fish.

References

Gobiidae
Taxa named by Artem Mikhailovich Prokofiev
Fish described in 2016